Narendra Luther (23 March 1932 – 19 January 2021) was a writer, civil servant, author and columnist.  He died on the morning of Tuesday, 19 January 2021 in Hyderabad, Telangana State India. He worked on the history and culture of erstwhile Hyderabad state and its rulers.  He was President of the Society to Save Rocks, Hyderabad, India.

Noted Academician, Sachidananda Mohanty writes,

Current Chief Minister of Telangana, Sri K. Chandrashekar Rao recalled the contribution of Narendra Luther on his death and expressed his condolences,

References

External links
 http://www.narendraluther.in/

1932 births
2021 deaths
Writers from Hyderabad, India
20th-century Indian writers
20th-century Indian male writers